Birdeye speedwell or bird's eye speedwell is a common name for several plants and may refer to:

Veronica chamaedrys
Veronica persica, native to Eurasia